Acousto-electronics (also spelled 'Acoustoelectronics') is a branch of physics, acoustics and electronics that studies interactions of ultrasonic and hypersonic waves in solids with electrons and with electro-magnetic fields. Typical phenomena studied in acousto-electronics are acousto-electric effect and also amplification of acoustic waves by flows of electrons in piezoelectric semiconductors, when the drift velocity of the electrons exceeds the velocity of sound. The term 'acousto-electronics' is often understood in a wider sense to include numerous practical applications of the interactions of electro-magnetic fields with acoustic waves in solids. In particular, these are signal processing devices using surface acoustic waves (SAW), different sensors of temperature, pressure, humidity, acceleration, etc.

See also
 Acousto-optics
 Rayleigh wave
 Love wave
 Interdigital transducer
 Picosecond ultrasonics

Further reading
 White, D.L., Amplification of ultrasonic waves in piezoelectric semiconductors, Journal of Applied Physics, 33(8), 2547 - 2554 (1962).  
 Hickernell, F.S., The piezoelectric semiconductor and acoustoelectronic device development in the sixties, IEEE Transactions on Ultrasonics, Ferroelectrics and Frequency Control, 52(5), 737-45 (2005).
 Gulyaev, Yu.V., Hickernell, F.S., Acoustoelectronics: History, present state, and new ideas for a new era, Acoustical Physics, 51(1), 81-88 (2005).

External links
 Consortium for Applied Acoustoelectronic Technology - University of Central Florida
 
Acoustics
Electronics